Lee Chae-min (born September 15, 2000) is a South Korean actor. He appeared in the television series High Class (2021), Love All Play (2022), and Crash Course in Romance (2023). He hosts KBS music program Music Bank since September 2022.

Filmography

Film

Television series

Television show

References

External links 
  at Gold Medalist 
 
 

2000 births
Living people
21st-century South Korean male actors
South Korean male television actors
South Korean male film actors
South Korean television presenters
Korea National University of Arts alumni